A Harry Warren Showcase is an album by pianist Kenny Drew recorded in 1957 and released on the Riverside Records subsidiary Judson label. The album was rereleased on CD by Milestone Records as a compilation with its companion album A Harold Arlen Showcase as Kenny Drew Plays the Music of Harry Warren and Harold Arlen in 1995.

Reception
The Allmusic review called the compilation "melodic, tasteful and lightly swinging... a nice set if not all that essential".

Track listing
 "You Must Have Been a Beautiful Baby" (Johnny Mercer, Harry Warren) – 2:02    
 "Lullaby of Broadway" (Al Dubin, Warren) – 1:55    
 "Remember Me" (Dubin, Warren) – 3:55    
 "Jeepers Creepers" (Mercer, Warren) – 3:06    
 "I Only Have Eyes for You" (Dubin, Warren) – 4:02    
 "You're My Everything" (Mort Dixon, Joe Young, Warren) – 2:42    
 "You'll Never Know" (Mack Gordon, Warren) – 2:52    
 "The Boulevard of Broken Dreams" (Dubin, Warren) – 4:04    
 "You're Getting to Be a Habit with Me" (Dubin, Warren) – 2:04    
 "Serenade in Blue" (Gordon, Warren) – 3:05    
 "About a Quarter to Nine" (Dubin, Warren) – 2:33    
 "September in the Rain" (Dubin, Warren) – 2:35

Personnel
Kenny Drew – piano
Wilbur Ware – bass

References

Kenny Drew albums
1957 albums
Riverside Records albums
Albums produced by Orrin Keepnews